Starovatovo is a rural locality (a selo) in Khalbakinsky Rural Okrug of Vilyuysky District in the Sakha Republic, Russia,  from Vilyuysk, the administrative center of the district, and  from Tosu, the administrative center of the rural okrug. Its population as of the 2010 Census was 78, down from 93 recorded during the 2002 Census.

References

Notes

Sources
Official website of the Sakha Republic. Registry of the Administrative-Territorial Divisions of the Sakha Republic. Vilyuysky District. 

Rural localities in Vilyuysky District